Honda's first production V6 was the C series; it was produced in displacements from 2.0 to 3.5 liters. The C engine was produced in various forms for over 20 years (1985–2005), having first been used in the KA series Legend model, and its British sister car the Rover 800-series (and Sterling).

All C engines share in common a 90-degree V-angle from bank to bank, common cylinder block bore centers, and four valves per cylinder. It is an all-aluminum design, and uses timing belt-driven single or dual overhead camshafts; the water pump is also driven by the timing belt. 

All C engines use an interference design; if the timing belt fails, any open valves will clash into the pistons, and severe engine damage will occur. 

The engine family can be broken down into three sub families:
 C20A, C20AT, C25A and C27A (transversely mounted)
 C30A and C32B  (transversely mounted rear)
 C32A, C35A, and C35B (one-off) (longitudinally mounted)

As a general rule, interchange of parts will not work between these sub groups.

C20A

SOHC 
  at 6,500 rpm
  at 5,500 rpm

Japan only;

 1986–1988 Honda Legend
 Experimental HP-X (Honda Pininfarina Xperimental)

The variable length intake manifold used six individual small-bore intake runners below 3,500 rpm for each cylinder and added an additional six individual larger bore intake runners at higher RPMs.

The C20AT was a turbocharged version, called the "Wing Turbo", producing .

Japan only:
 1989 Honda Legend

Honda replaced the variable length intake manifold with a variable geometry turbocharger to the C20A engine used in the Japanese Domestic Market Legend. The turbo with intercooler-equipped engine was the C20AT engine and are extremely rare. Honda pioneered variable-geometry turbo chargers. The "Wing Turbo", as Honda called them, were controlled by an 8-bit processor ECU and they were constantly adjusting. Basically, at low speeds the wings surrounding the turbine wheel inside the compressor housing on the intake side would be nearly closed to speed and direct exhaust pressure precisely on the turbine wheel. At 2000 rpm, the wings would fluctuate and it would act like a much larger turbo to increase fuel economy as needed. This car was quick and powerful, but the price premium over the slightly longer and wider Legend with the  naturally aspirated V6 was too much for most, so the car disappeared. This was one of the only production Hondas ever turbocharged from the factory (excluding turbo engines of kei car for the Japan domestic market), along with the K23A1 straight-4 engine used in the Acura RDX and the ER straight-4 engine used in the first generation Honda City until model year 2017, when most of their model lines had the option of the 1.5L turbocharged engine.

C25A

SOHC (2.5 L) V6 24 valves, 9.0:1 compression

Japan
   at 6,000 rpm
  at 4,500 rpm
North America:
 1986-1987 Honda Legend Sedan, 1986-1988 Rover 825 Sedan,
 at 5,800 rpm
  at 4,500 rpm
 UK and Europe (sold in US as Sterling 825i)

The engine utilized a 90 degree V-angle to the crankshaft in preference to the taller but more common 60 degree design, with a compression ratio of 9.0:1. The crankshaft had crankpins offset 30 degrees to provide a low profile engine that fires smoothly and evenly. The block and cross flow pent roof cylinder heads with 24 valves are die-cast from aluminum alloy and the cylinder bores are lined with cast iron. The exhaust system uses equal length exhaust pipes connected to the Exhaust manifold to minimize scavenging resistance and maximum total exhaust efficiency. An external high capacity water cooled oil cooler and filter maintain an efficient oil temperature.

C27A

The SOHC C27A is a 2.7 L version, with the major upgrade being the addition of a variable length intake manifold, producing up to 

Applications; non-North America:

 C27A2 - 1988-1990 Honda Legend Coupe,  (non catalyst) UK and Europe
 C27A2 - 1988-1990 Honda Legend Saloon,  (non catalyst) UK and Europe
 C27A2 - 1987-1991 Rover 827/Sterling/Vitesse,  (non catalyst) UK and Europe
 C27A1 - 1991 Rover 827/Sterling/Vitesse,  (catalyst) UK and Europe 
 C27A1 - 1991-1995 Rover 827/Sterling/Coupe,  (catalyst) UK and Europe

Applications; North America:

 C27A1 - 1987-1990 Acura Legend Coupe,  (catalyst) 
 C27A1 - 1988-1990 Acura Legend,  (catalyst)
 C27A4 - 1995-1997 Honda Accord,  (catalyst) For this particular vehicle the engine was updated with a more efficient intake manifold.
 C27A1 - 1988-1991 Sterling 827,  (catalyst)

C30A
The engine has a bore and stroke of 90mm x 78mm, making the engine highly over square, which facilitates a shift in power to the higher end of the rpm range. The engine was the second Honda engine ever to utilize Honda's proprietary VTEC variable valve timing system in an automotive application after the B16A, which adjusts cam lift and duration depending on engine RPM and throttle position. VTEC allows the C30A to produce a high maximum power level while maintaining a relatively flat torque curve. C30A was also equipped with Variable Volume Induction System (VVIS), which used a primary and a secondary intake plenum. Secondary intake plenum engages at 4800 RPM to improve engines breathing ability and broadens torque curve.

The C30A also made use of titanium connecting rods, which was another first in a mass-production vehicle. The lightweight rods allowed a higher RPM to be achieved while maintaining the strength of traditional steel rods. The C30A block is an open-deck design made from an aluminum alloy with cylinders sleeved in ductile iron. The heads are 4 valves per cylinder (24 valves per engine total), twin-cam design and contain the VTEC mechanism, which is actuated by oil pressure. For maximum performance, the C30A uses a direct ignition system, with individual coils positioned directly over each cylinder spark plug.

Due to its DOHC layout and its lightweight rotating assembly, the C30A is capable of reliable high RPM operation.

Due to its complexity, cost and use of exotic materials, the C30A was used exclusively on Honda's NSX car. For NSXs equipped with a 4-speed automatic transmission, Honda used a slightly less powerful version of the C30A, with less aggressive cam timing and producing .

Though never mass produced, a heavily upgraded version of the engine was briefly used in GT-spec NSXs for the 2004 JGTC racing series by the Team Honda Racing satellite team. This engine was extensively modified by Mugen and was the first turbocharged Honda engine used in the series: prior GT-spec NSXs used a variant of the naturally aspirated C32B engine.

Applications:
 1991-1996 Honda NSX (5-Speed Manual Transmission)
 1991-2005 Honda NSX (4-Speed Automatic Transmission)
 1994-1996 Honda NSX Le Mans
 2004 Honda NSX-GT Super GT

C32A

The C32A is a  version.

Applications;
 C32A - SOHC USDM -  and 
 1991-1995 Acura Legend sedan
 1991-1992 Acura Legend coupé
 C32A6 - SOHC USDM -  and 
 1996-1998 Acura 3.2TL
 1994-1995 Acura Legend GS sedan
 1993-1995 Acura Legend LS and L coupe
 C32A5 - SOHC JDM -  and 
 1995-1998 Honda Inspire/Honda Saber

C32B

The engine is essentially an update to the C30A and does not share commonality with the C32A. Honda increased displacement to  through the use of larger  pistons over the  used in the C30A, while leaving the  stroke the same. To accommodate the larger pistons, Honda used an advanced metallurgical technique on the cylinders called Fiber Reinforced Metal (FRM), in which an ultra lightweight alumina-carbon fiber is cast into the traditional aluminum alloy for enhanced rigidity. This process allowed thinner cylinder walls to be used while providing acceptable cooling characteristics. The C32B also used  intake valves, which are  larger than those in the C30A.

Applications:
 1997-2005 Honda NSX (6-Speed manual transmission)
 1996-2002, 2005-2009 Honda NSX-GT Super GT
 2002 Vemac RD320R Super GT

C35A

The C35A was the first mass-produced engine to use block forged connecting rods contributing to precise balancing and an exceptionally strong bottom end. The C35 also contains a balance shaft to dampen engine vibrations associated with 90 degree design V6 engines. Besides the addition of these forged components, the overall design is similar to its smaller counterpart the C32A, with some parts being interchangeable. The 9.6:1 compression ratio of the C32A is also retained, despite the increase in displacement.

Applications:
 C35A - SOHC JDM - 
 1996-2004 Honda Legend 
 C35A1 - SOHC USDM - 
 C35A2 - SOHC EDM - 
 1996-1998 Honda Legend  
 C35A5 - SOHC EDM - 
 1998-2004 Honda Legend

C35B

The C35B (name unconfirmed) is a DOHC V6 with VTEC which shares basic design properties with its SOHC non-VTEC counterpart but with more aggressive camshafts and slightly lighter cylinder walls. This was the only DOHC VTEC V6 ever built by Honda for longitudinal applications and was only used in one non-production car, the Honda FS-X concept.

Applications:
 1991 Honda FS-X concept -

See also

 List of Honda engines

References

C
V6 engines
Engines by model
Gasoline engines by model